Abaunza is a Basque surname. Notable people with the surname include:

Bayardo Abaunza, American soccer player
Héctor Abaunza (born 1938), Mexican fencer
Justo Abaunza (1778–1872), Nicaraguan politician
Lila T. Abaunza (1929–2008), First Lady of Nicaragua
Manuel Abaunza (born 1941), American soccer player

Basque-language surnames